John Arthur Fitzpatrick (March 19, 1904 – November 19, 1990), nicknamed "Foghorn" and "Eagle Beak", was an American Major League Baseball coach and scout and minor league catcher and manager. He was born in LaSalle, Illinois, but later in his life lived in McAlester, Oklahoma.

Fitzpatrick appeared in 1,933 games over 21 seasons (1924–41; 1944–46) as a minor league player, batting .288. At one point is his career, he went one and a half years without striking out. He was a coach for the Pittsburgh Pirates from 1953–55 and the Milwaukee Braves from 1958–59.

He managed minor league teams intermittently during the period of 1936–63 in the Pittsburgh, Chicago White Sox, Cleveland Indians, Brooklyn Dodgers, New York Yankees, Chicago Cubs and Los Angeles Angels farm systems. He was a longtime associate of Fred Haney, whom he served as a coach with the Hollywood Stars, Pirates and Braves, and for whom he scouted for the Angels after his managing career.

He died at age 86 in San Diego, California.

External links

Coach's page from Retrosheet

1904 births
1990 deaths
Ardmore Bearcats players
Bartlesville Bearcats players
Baseball catchers
Baseball players from Illinois
California Angels scouts
Dallas Steers players
Davenport Blue Sox players
Longview Cannibals players
Major League Baseball first base coaches
Milwaukee Braves coaches
Minor league baseball managers
Mission Reds players
Newport News Dodgers players
Oklahoma City Indians players
Okmulgee Drillers players
Olean Oilers players
People from LaSalle, Illinois
Portland Beavers players
Pittsburgh Pirates coaches
Rayne Rice Birds players
Salina Millers players
Waterloo Hawks (baseball) players
LaSalle Blue Sox players